XPC may refer to the following:

 Pecheneg language, ISO 639-3 code 'xpc'
 Shuttle XPC, popular line of barebones computers and cases.
 SPEC XPC, the X Performance Characterization group working under the SPEC GPC group.
 Xeroderma pigmentosum, complementation group C, a human gene
 xPC Target, a product from MathWorks
 XPC Golf Clubs, a proprietary brand from Golfsmith